Borja Mendía Sangroniz (born 10 November 1994) is a Spanish professional basketball player for Zornotza ST of the LEB Plata.

Professional career
Mendía began his professional career in the Bilbao Basket in 2013, on loan to Zornotza ST during the 2013–14 season and the 2014–15 season.

Career statistics

Domestic leagues

|-
| style="text-align:left;"| 2014–15
| style="text-align:left;"| Bilbao
| 10 || 1 || 2.0 || .200 || .000 || .500 || .2 || .1 || .2 || .0 || .3 || –0.7

References

External links
 Borja Mendía at acb.com
 Borja Mendía at eurobasket.com
 

1994 births
Living people
Bilbao Basket players
Liga ACB players
Small forwards
Spanish men's basketball players
Sportspeople from Bilbao
Basketball players from the Basque Country (autonomous community)